American Dream/American Knightmare is a 2018 Showtime television documentary film about Suge Knight directed by Antoine Fuqua.

Synopsis
American Dream/American Knightmare is a documentary about the life and career of gangsta rap producer and Death Row Records co-founder Suge Knight. The film includes interviews conducted by Fuqua with Knight between December 2011 and November 2012 in which Knight details how it all came about as well as how it all fell apart.

Cast
Marion "Suge" Knight Jr.
Marion "Suge" Knight Sr., Suge's father
Maxine Knight, Suge's mother
Costello Knight, Suge's uncle
Thomas Knight, Suge's uncle

Broadcast
The film aired on Showtime at 8:30 p.m. on December 21, 2018, just months after Knight pleaded no contest to voluntary manslaughter in a 2015 hit-and-run case and was sentenced to 28 years in prison. It was given a rating of TV-MA.

Reception
In his review of the film, Brian Lowry of CNN wrote, "Although Knight isn't always the most reliable narrator, the filmmaker gives him the latitude to tell his tale, describing a world of money, power and violence, while alternating between explaining and lamenting those dynamics." He later summarized, "Fuqua's approach isn't necessarily journalistic, but rather seems designed to let the mogul relate his own story as he experienced it."

In a review for Vulture.com, Paul Thompson wrote, "None of these conversations are particularly revelatory. Knight is given to aphorism and, obviously, to anything that will burnish his own myth." He adds that the film "is not quite hagiography, but it allows its subject the final say (and often the only say) on virtually all the key moments in his personal and professional lives."

References

External links
 

2018 films
2018 television films
2018 documentary films
Documentary films about African Americans
Documentary films about criminals
Documentary films about the music industry
Films directed by Antoine Fuqua
Films produced by Antoine Fuqua
Films scored by Aaron Zigman
Rockumentaries
Showtime (TV network) documentary films
2010s English-language films
2010s American films